Russian Formula Three Championship is the name of a former Russian Formula Three racing competition.
Starting in 1997, the series ended in 2002, it was relaunched in 2008 but only for one season.

Champions

External links
 Russian Formula 1600/Formula 3 official website 
 Autoreview newspaper archive 

1997 establishments in Russia
2008 disestablishments in Russia
Formula racing series
Auto racing series in Russia
Formula Three series
Defunct auto racing series
Defunct sports competitions in Russia
National championships in Russia